Earth City is an unincorporated community located in St. Louis County, Missouri, United States, along Interstate 70, near the Missouri River. It is bounded by the city of Bridgeton on the east and north, the city of Maryland Heights to the south, and the Missouri River to the west. It is also near Lambert International Airport. The town is notable as being home to the headquarters of the Save-A-Lot grocery chain and a major UPS shipping hub. It also has a large business park bounded by I-70 on the south, I-270 on the east, and Missouri Route 370 to the north. It is within three miles of three major river-crossing bridges over the Missouri River.

Earth City is the home to the corporate headquarters of Spectrum Brands (Pet, Home and Garden division). Spectrum Brands was voted Best Places to Work in St. Louis in 2016 by the St. Louis Business Journal.

Earth City is home to the former Rams Park, the former training facility and offices of the St. Louis Rams during the Rams time in St. Louis from 1995 to 2015. The facility is now known as the Lou Fusz Athletic Training Center, and is home to The Lou Fusz Soccer Club. (The Lou Fusz Athletic Training Center also currently serves as the offices and training facility of the St. Louis BattleHawks of the XFL.)

References

External links
 Earth City Levee District
 Northwest Chamber of Commerce

Unincorporated communities in St. Louis County, Missouri
Unincorporated communities in Missouri